Pedro Joel Pereira da Silva (born 24 October 1990), known as Joel, is a Portuguese professional footballer who plays for Lusitânia F.C. as a forward.

Club career
Born in Barcelos, Joel joined local Santa Maria FC's youth system in 2001, aged 11. He went on to spend three full seasons with the first team, in amateur football.

Joel made his professional debut in the 2012–13 campaign, scoring one goal in 23 Segunda Liga matches for S.C. Freamunde and eventually suffering relegation. He added 17 the following campaign, helping the club achieve immediate promotion.

On 14 June 2014, Joel signed a two-year contract with C.D. Tondela. He contributed 14 starting appearances in his debut season, to help his team reach the Primeira Liga for the first time in their history.

References

External links

1990 births
Living people
People from Barcelos, Portugal
Portuguese footballers
Association football forwards
Liga Portugal 2 players
Campeonato de Portugal (league) players
Santa Maria F.C. players
S.C. Freamunde players
C.D. Tondela players
C.D. Aves players
C.D. Santa Clara players
AD Fafe players
F.C. Alverca players
Lusitânia F.C. players
Championnat National 2 players
US Lusitanos Saint-Maur players
Portuguese expatriate footballers
Expatriate footballers in France
Portuguese expatriate sportspeople in France
Sportspeople from Braga District